Billionaires' Row is an array of ultra-luxury residential skyscrapers, constructed or in development, that are distributed roughly along the southern end of Central Park in Manhattan, New York City. Since most of these pencil towers are on 57th Street, the term has been used to refer to the street itself as well.

Context
The area is notable for containing some of the most expensive residences in the world.  The top two floors of One57 sold to Michael Dell for $100.47 million in 2015, setting a record for the most expensive apartment ever sold in New York. Another bi-level apartment in the building was bought by hedge fund manager Bill Ackman for $91.5 million. The top penthouse at 432 Park Avenue went to Saudi retail magnate Fawaz Al Hokair for $87.7 million, and hedge fund manager Kenneth C. Griffin is said to have bought four floors at 220 Central Park South for $238 million, breaking One57's record for the most expensive home sold in New York City and setting a new record for the most expensive home sold in the United States. Also at 220 CPS, several units were combined into a four-story mansion costing $250 million. These projects have generated controversy concerning the economic conditions and zoning policies that have encouraged these buildings, as well as the impact these towers will have on the surrounding neighborhoods and the shadows they will cast on Central Park. As of August 2021, an estimated 44% of units in seven buildings considered to be part of Billionaires' Row still hadn't been sold.

One of the factors underlying the boom is foreign investment, often in the form of capital flight.  Some of these buyers have poured money into high-end New York real estate for the purpose of tax avoidance, money laundering, or to export wealth to jurisdictions where it is less easily seized. Many of the apartments are only sporadically occupied, functioning as pied-à-terres, or as real-estate based "safe deposit boxes" for parking money.

The ultra-luxury building boom in the area predates the term "Billionaire's Row".  Deutsche Bank Center, built in 2003, is at the southwest corner of Central Park.  A majority of its tenants bought their condos anonymously (through shell companies and trusts); at least 17 of these have been identified as billionaires. 15 Central Park West (CPW), two blocks north, contains units that have been purchased by billionaires Sara Blakely, Lloyd Blankfein, Omid Kordestani, Daniel Loeb, Daniel Och, Eyal Ofer, Pan Shiyi, Sandy Weill, Jerry Yang, and Zhang Xin.  Prior to the sale of the $100 million penthouse at One57, the record for an apartment in New York was $88 million paid by Dmitry Rybolovlev for a penthouse at 15 CPW.

In 2016, the United States Treasury Department announced it would start identifying and tracking the purchase of multi-million-dollar units, especially those paid for in cash or via shell companies, to cut down on the practice of money laundering. New laws in China restricting capital outflow have also been implemented, and lower oil prices have affected potential Middle Eastern buyers. Uncertainty over Brexit has also played a role. This has weakened the market for the highest-end units, with some declaring that the "Eight Digit Boom" on Billionaire's Row has ended. In the face of this soft market, at least one project in the area (1 Park Lane) has been put on hold.

Buildings
The first supertall building to be built in the area was One57, a  apartment building between Sixth and Seventh Avenues that was completed in 2014.   By then, several other even-taller skyscrapers were proposed or under construction along the stretch of 57th Street roughly corresponding to the southern edge of Central Park.  Due to the often record-breaking prices that have been set for the apartments in these buildings, the press dubbed this section of 57th Street "Billionaires' Row". The term has since been extended to other supertall luxury buildings facing southern Central Park not strictly on 57th Street.

Projects (planned, under way, or complete) that have been listed as part of Billionaires' Row include:

References

Neighborhoods in Manhattan
Residential skyscrapers in Manhattan
57th Street (Manhattan)
Upper class culture in New York City